The Clarksburg School is located in the Clarksburg section of Millstone Township, Monmouth County, New Jersey, United States. The building was built in 1925 and added to the National Register of Historic Places on November 12, 1999.

See also
National Register of Historic Places listings in Monmouth County, New Jersey

References

School buildings on the National Register of Historic Places in New Jersey
School buildings completed in 1925
Buildings and structures in Monmouth County, New Jersey
National Register of Historic Places in Monmouth County, New Jersey
New Jersey Register of Historic Places
Millstone Township, New Jersey
1925 establishments in New Jersey